Kolopsoides is an extinct genus of Zygomaturinae marsupial from the Otibanda Formation, Pliocene of Watut River, Papua New Guinea.

References

 Long, J., Archer, M., Flannery, T., & Hand, S. (2002) Prehistoric mammals of Australia and New Guinea: One hundred million years of evolution. University of New South Wales Press (page 16)
 Kolopsoides cultridens at the Paleobiology Database

Prehistoric vombatiforms
Prehistoric vertebrates of Oceania
Prehistoric marsupial genera